Mothership Connection is the fourth album by American funk band Parliament, released on December 15, 1975 on Casablanca Records. This concept album is often rated among the best Parliament-Funkadelic releases, and was the first to feature horn players Maceo Parker and Fred Wesley, who had previously backed James Brown in the J.B.'s.

Mothership Connection became Parliament's first album to be certified gold and later platinum.  The Library of Congress added the album to the National Recording Registry in 2011, declaring "The album has had an enormous influence on jazz, rock and dance music."

Concept

The album is held together by a loose, escapist outer-space theme. Describing the concept, George Clinton said "We had put black people in situations nobody ever thought they would be in, like the White House. I figured another place you wouldn't think black people would be was in outer space. I was a big fan of Star Trek, so we did a thing with a pimp sitting in a spaceship shaped like a Cadillac, and we did all these James Brown-type grooves, but with street talk and ghetto slang." The album's concept would form the backbone of P-Funk's concert performances during the 1970s, in which a large spaceship prop known as the Mothership would be lowered onto the stage as part of Dr. Funkenstein's arrival.

BBC Music described the album as a pioneering work of afrofuturism "set in a future universe where black astronauts interact with alien worlds." Journalist Frasier McAlpine stated that "As a reaction to an increasingly fraught 1970s urban environment in which African-American communities faced the end of the optimism of the civil rights era, this flamboyant imagination (and let's be frank, exceptional funkiness) was both righteous and joyful."

Reception

On release, Rolling Stone called it a "parody of modern funk" and stated that "unlike the Ohio Players or Commodores, the group refuses to play it straight. Instead, Clinton spews his jive, conceived from some cosmic funk vision." Village Voice critic Robert Christgau said, "That DJ from Chocolate City, or maybe it's the Chocolate Milky Way, keeps the beat going with nothing but his rap, some weird keyboard, and cymbals for stretches of side one. And later produces the galactic 'Give Up the Funk' and a James Brown tribute that goes 'gogga googa, gogga googa'—only believe me, that doesn't capture it."

Retrospectively, it gained high regard. Rolling Stone's 2003 review gave the record 5 stars: "The masterpiece, the slang creator, the icon builder, the master narrative--or 'the bomb,' as Clinton succinctly put it before anyone else." AllMusic called it "the definitive Parliament-Funkadelic album," in which "George Clinton's revolving band lineups, differing musical approaches, and increasingly thematic album statements reached an ideal state, one that resulted in enormous commercial success as well as a timeless legacy." Dr. Dre famously sampled the songs "Mothership Connection (Star Child)" and "P-Funk (Wants to Get Funked Up)" on his album The Chronic.

The album has received many accolades, including being named TV network VH1's 55th greatest album of all time. In 2012, it was ranked at number 276 on Rolling Stone magazine's list of the 500 greatest albums of all time. It was featured again on the 2020 edition, at number 363. Vibe listed Mothership Connection in their "Essential Black Rock Recordings" list, and it was included in the 2005 book 1001 Albums You Must Hear Before You Die.

Track listing

Personnel
Lead vocals - George Clinton (Lead in "P. Funk (Wants to Get Funked Up)", "Mothership Connection (Star Child)"), Calvin Simon, Fuzzy Haskins, Ray Davis, Grady Thomas, Gary Shider (lead in "Handcuffs"), Glenn Goins (lead in "Unfunky UFO", "Handcuffs"), Bootsy Collins
Horns - Fred Wesley, Maceo Parker, Michael Brecker, Randy Brecker, Boom, Joe Farrell
Bass guitar - Bootsy Collins, Cordell Mosson 
Guitars - Garry Shider, Michael Hampton, Glenn Goins, Bootsy Collins
Drums and percussion - Tiki Fulwood, Jerome Brailey, Bootsy Collins, Gary Cooper
 Keyboards and synthesizers - Bernie Worrell  (Minimoog, Wurlitzer electric piano, ARP Pro Soloist and String Ensemble, RMI Electra Piano, Hammond organ, grand piano, Fender Rhodes, clavinet D6)
Backing vocals and handclaps - Gary Cooper, Debbie Edwards, Taka Kahn, Archie Ivy, Bryna Chimenti, Rasputin Boutte, Pam Vincent, Debra Wright, Sidney Barnes

Production
Produced by George Clinton
Engineered by Jim Vitti (in Detroit, Michigan), Ralph (Oops) Jim Callon (in Hollywood, California)
Mastered by Allen Zentz
Photography by David Alexander
Art Direction and Design by Gribbitt!

Chart positions

Certification

See also
 Afrofuturism
 Album era

References

External links
 Mothership Connection: Banging hip-hop from worlds away at The Austin Chronicle

Parliament (band) albums
1975 albums
Casablanca Records albums
Science fiction concept albums
United States National Recording Registry recordings
United States National Recording Registry albums